Morpho thamyris, the Thamyris morpho, is a Neotropical butterfly found in Paraguay and Brazil (Santa Catarina, Mato Grosso, São Paulo, Rio Grande do Sul).

Many subspecies have been described.

Etymology
Thamyris was a singer in Greek mythology who was so proud of his skill that he boasted he could outsing the Muses. His story is told in the Iliad.

Taxonomy
Some authors consider Morpho thamyris to be a subspecies of Morpho portis (Hübner, [1821])

References
 Eugène Le Moult & Pierre Réal, 1962-1963. Les Morpho d'Amérique du Sud et Centrale, Editions du cabinet entomologique E. Le Moult, Paris.
 Adalbert Seitz (Ed.) 1907. Die Gross-Schmetterlinge der Erde, vol. 5. Stuttgart, Alfred Kernen.
Paul Smart, 1976 The Illustrated Encyclopedia of the Butterfly World in Color. London, Salamander: Encyclopedie des papillons. Lausanne, Elsevier Sequoia (French language edition)   page 234 fig. 2 (Brazil) and page 235 fig. 8, underside (Brazil).

External links
"Morpho Fabricius, 1807" at Markku Savela's Lepidoptera and Some Other Life Forms
Butterflies of America Images of type and other specimens of Morpho portis thamyris.

Morpho
Butterflies described in 1867
Fauna of Brazil
Nymphalidae of South America
Taxa named by Baron Cajetan von Felder
Taxa named by Rudolf Felder